Karaboya can refer to:

 Karaboya, Kargı
 a former name for Khnkoyan